Daniela Múñoz Gallegos (born 30 January 1984) is a Mexican former tennis player.

Múñoz Gallegos has career-high WTA rankings of 328 in singles, reached on 8 October 2007, and 280 in doubles, achieved on 14 September 2009. She won four singles titles and 21 doubles titles at tournaments of the ITF Women's Circuit.

Playing for Mexico Fed Cup team, Múñoz Gallegos has a win–loss record of 14–14.

She made her WTA Tour main-draw debut at the 2010 Abierto Mexicano Telcel in the doubles event, partnering Ximena Hermoso.

ITF finals

Singles: 6 (4–2)

Doubles: 31 (21–10)

References

External links
 
 
 

1984 births
Living people
Mexican female tennis players
Sportspeople from Durango
Competitors at the 2006 Central American and Caribbean Games
Central American and Caribbean Games bronze medalists for Mexico
Central American and Caribbean Games medalists in tennis
Tennis players at the 2007 Pan American Games
Pan American Games competitors for Mexico
20th-century Mexican women
21st-century Mexican women